Euceriodes pallada is a moth of the subfamily Arctiinae first described by Herbert Druce in 1906. It is found in Brazil.

References

Moths described in 1906
Arctiini